Athlone Boys' High School is a boys-only high school located in, Bezuidenhout Valley, Johannesburg, South Africa.

Notable alumni 

George Bizos, human rights lawyer

Johnny Clegg, Musician

Sol Kerzner, businessman

Harold Luntz, legal academic

References

Schools in Gauteng
Educational institutions established in 1915
1915 establishments in South Africa